Oren Sturman Copeland (March 16, 1887 – April 10, 1958) was an American Republican Party politician.

He was born on a farm near Huron, South Dakota on March 16, 1887, and moved with his parents to Pender, Nebraska in 1891. He attended the University of Nebraska-Lincoln from 1904 to 1907 and worked at a Lincoln newspaper in 1910 and a gas station in 1913.

He served as city commissioner in the department of public safety from 1935 to 1937 when he was elected mayor of Lincoln. He resigned as mayor to run for congress and was elected to the Seventy-seventh United States Congress. He was unsuccessful in being renominated and returned to the retail fuel business. He was a delegate to the 1912 Republican National Convention. He died in Lincoln on April 10, 1958, and is buried there in Wyuka Cemetery.

References
 
 
 
 

1887 births
1958 deaths
Mayors of Lincoln, Nebraska
People from Huron, South Dakota
People from Pender, Nebraska
University of Nebraska–Lincoln alumni
Republican Party members of the United States House of Representatives from Nebraska
20th-century American politicians